Michael A. Shaw is an American politician from Maine. A Democrat, Shaw was a member of the Maine House of Representatives from November 2008 to August 2015. He was re-elected in 2010, 2012 and 2014. Following his 2012 re-election, Shaw was appointed Chair of the Inland Fisheries & Wildlife Committee. Shaw resigned in August 2015 after his employer relocated to Freeport.

Shaw attended Southern Maine Community College.

References

Year of birth missing (living people)
Living people
People from Standish, Maine
Democratic Party members of the Maine House of Representatives
Southern Maine Community College alumni
21st-century American politicians